Radio Nacional de Colombia ("Colombian National Radio") is a Colombian state-owned public radio network, part of Señal Colombia RTVC. It was launched – as Radiodifusora Nacional de Colombia – on 1 February 1940, three years after closure of the country's first state-owned radio station, HJN.

Between 1954 and 1963, Radiodifusora Nacional was also responsible for National Television, then the only television network in the country.

As of 2019, the network broadcasts news and information from state and other institutional agencies in addition to coverage of all aspects of Colombian culture in programmes grouped under the heading Colombiología, with the motto Colombiología al aire ("Colombiology on the air").

Broadcasting on both AM and FM, Radio Nacional covers Colombia's 32 departmental capitals, including Bogotá, as well as a number of other medium-sized municipalities.

Frequencies 
 Arauca HJPG 92.3 FM
 Armenia HJ?? 98.7 FM
 Barrancabermeja HJ?? 94.7 FM
 Barranquilla HJZO 680 AM (licensed to Sabanagrande) (also served by HJXB 91.1 FM from Cartagena de Indias)
 Bogotá HJND 570 AM / HJIN 95.9 FM
 Bucaramanga HJZM 92.3 FM (licensed to Lebrija)
 Cali HJHP 580 AM (licensed to Jamundí)
 Cartagena de Indias HJXB 91.1 FM
 Chigorodó HJYN 89.3 FM
 Cúcuta HJZC 97.9 FM
 Duitama HJXE 97.3 FM
 El Carmen HJO40 104.7 FM
 Florencia HJXG 96.3 FM
 Garzón HJYT 94.3 FM (licensed to El Agrado)
 Ibagué HKC26 99.0 FM
 Inírida HJYE 92.3 FM
 Leticia HKR74 95.5 FM
 Manizales HJJG 1000 AM / HJXF 92.7 FM
 Medellín HJHF 550 AM (licensed to Marinilla)
 Mitú HJA68 88.3 FM
 Mocoa HJZJ 98.3 FM
 Montería HJYP 98.5 FM (licensed to Ciénaga de Oro)
 Mocoa HJZJ 98.3 FM
 Neiva HJXK 94.3 FM
 Pasto HJYV 93.5 FM
 Pamplona HJXO 97.9 FM
 Popayán HJXI 90.1 FM (licensed to El Tambo)
 Puerto Carreño HJYL 94.3 FM 
 Quibdó HJZ76 95.3 FM
 Riohacha HJD90 610 AM (licensed to Uribia)
 San Andrés HJC57 93.5 FM
 San Gil HJP41 93.7 FM
 San José del Guaviare HJYG 96.3 FM
 San Vicente del Caguán HJXH 94.3 FM
 Santa Marta HJXL 95.1 FM [sharing the frequency with Señal Radiónica Santa Marta]
 Sincelejo HJP62 89.8 FM
 San Vicente del Caguán HJXH 91.5 FM
 Tunja HJGS 560 AM (also served by HJXE 97.3 FM from Duitama)
 Valledupar HJXJ 97.7 FM
 Valle del Guamuez HJ?? 92.7 FM
 Villavicencio HJXN 92.3 FM (licensed to El Calvario)
 Yopal HJYO 92.3 FM

Sources:Actualización Plan técnico nacional de radiodifusión sonora en AM - julio de 2013, Ministerio de las Tecnologías de la Información y las Comunicaciones, retrieved 2014-05-06

References

External links 
 Señal Radio Colombia

Radio stations in Colombia
Radio stations established in 1940